Heikki Laine (born 16 June 1936) is a Finnish rower. He competed in the men's coxless four event at the 1960 Summer Olympics.

References

1936 births
Living people
Finnish male rowers
Olympic rowers of Finland
Rowers at the 1960 Summer Olympics
Sportspeople from Turku